Clifford Branch Jr. (August 1, 1948 – August 3, 2019) was an American professional football player who was a wide receiver with the Oakland/Los Angeles Raiders during his entire 14-year National Football League (NFL) career. He won three NFL championships with the Raiders in Super Bowl XI, XV and XVIII. He was selected by the Raiders in the fourth round of the 1972 NFL Draft after playing college football for the Colorado Buffaloes.  He was posthumously elected to the Pro Football Hall of Fame in 2022.

College career
Branch attended college at the University of Colorado Boulder, where he was a sprinter on the track team and a receiver on the football team. In football with the Buffaloes in 1970, he caught 23 passes for 355 yards, had 22 carries for 119 yards and one touchdown. In 1971, he had 13 catches for 330 yards and 3 touchdowns along with 9 carries for 235 yards and 4 touchdowns.

In track, Branch set an NCAA championship meet record in the 100 meters with a time of 10.0 seconds at the 1972 NCAA championships semifinal in Eugene, Oregon.  Branch placed 5th in the final with 10.1, and he said "My goal has always been to win the NCAA 100 meter championship. This is my last track meet, since I expect to sign a pro contract with the Oakland Raiders within the next two weeks." He also posted a personal best of 20.5 seconds in the 200 meters. He graduated from Colorado in 1972.

Personal bests

Professional career

Oakland/Los Angeles Raiders
Branch was selected in the fourth round of the 1972 NFL Draft with the 98th overall pick by the Oakland Raiders. He spent his entire 14-year NFL career with the Oakland/Los Angeles Raiders, winning three Super Bowl rings in Super Bowl XI, Super Bowl XV and Super Bowl XVIII.

Branch had a slow start to his career, as his 1972 season consisted of one start in 14 games with three combined catches for 41 yards. 1973 was slightly better, as he caught 19 catches for 290 yards in total for three touchdowns. In the October 14 game against the San Diego Chargers, he caught his first touchdown pass, doing so on a pass from Ken Stabler in the 27–17 win. His third season proved his moment. He caught 60 passes for 13 touchdowns and 1,092 yards (the former two were career highs). He went to the Pro Bowl while also being named First-team All-Pro, owing to him leading the league in yards, touchdowns, and yards per game as a receiver. In the postseason, he had his best game for the AFC Championship, where he caught nine passes for 186 yards and a touchdown, but the Raiders lost to the Pittsburgh Steelers 24–13. In his 22 games as a receiver in the postseason, it was the first of three 100-yard games and it was the most catches he had in said game.

Branch would have a four-year peak that resulted in Pro Bowl (four) and All-Pro selections (three), with the 1976 season resulting in a career high 1,111 yards to go with 12 touchdowns on 46 catches. That year, the Raiders won their first championship, and Branch caught nine combined passes in three games for under 50 yards each, but they still prevailed in the Super Bowl regardless. In his final season of play with the Raiders in 1985, his season ended prematurely when he was placed on the injured reserve list. In 1986, he again landed on the reserve list after suffering a pulled hamstring during the preseason.

After having caught 212 passes for 3,967 yards and 43 touchdowns in his first six years, Branch played the remaining eight seasons with steady but eventual decline. He caught at least 27 passes in seven of those years for at least 400 yards, with the 1980 season (44 catches, 858 yards, 7 touchdowns) being his last hit year.

On October 2, 1983, Branch caught the longest pass by a Raider, as he caught a 99-yard pass from Jim Plunkett in the second quarter versus the Washington Redskins
. It was his only catch in the 37–35 loss, but he remains the only Raider to catch a 99-yard pass.

He had his last gasp of playoff play with the 1983 matchup against Pittsburgh, where he caught six passes for 76 yards in the 38–10 win (Branch did not make any catches in his true last playoff game, a 13–7 loss to Seattle on December 22). Branch finished his NFL career with 501 receptions for 8,685 yards and 67 touchdowns. In 20 playoff contests, he compiled 73 receptions for 1,289 yards, an average of 17.7 yards per catch, and five touchdowns. He held the NFL career playoff records for receptions and receiving yards, which stood until they were broken by Jerry Rice in 1993 and 1994, respectively, while with the San Francisco 49ers.  Among his individual accolades were being selected to four consecutive Pro Bowl teams (1974, 1975, 1976, and 1977), and three times being selected as a first-team All-Pro (1974, 1975, 1976).  In addition, he led the NFL in receiving yards once (1974) and receiving touchdowns twice (1974, 1976).

Later years
Branch played for the Los Angeles Cobras of the Arena Football League in 1988, their only season of existence.

He was cited by the NFL Network as #5 on players not in the Pro Football Hall of Fame, noted for his speed at the position of wide receiver while being overshadowed by receivers of his time like Pittsburgh rivals Lynn Swann, John Stallworth, and teammate Fred Biletnikoff. Minus Swann (whose numbers were considerably lower), Branch had comparable statistics to each of those players as each have over 500 receptions and 8,000 yards.

He was a nominee to the Pro Football Hall of Fame, and was a semifinalist in 2004 and 2010.  In 2011, the Professional Football Researchers Association named Branch to the PFRA Hall of Very Good Class of 2011.

On August 24, 2021, Branch was posthumously selected as the seniors finalist for the Pro Football Hall of Fame Class of 2022. On February 10, 2022, he was selected for enshrinement in the Pro Football Hall of Fame.

Death
Branch died on August 3, 2019, two days after his 71st birthday. His body was found in a hotel room in Bullhead City, Arizona. According to police his death was due to natural causes, based on an initial investigative report.

References

External links

 
 Cliff Branch on ArenaFan.com

1948 births
2019 deaths
American football wide receivers
Colorado Buffaloes football players
Colorado Buffaloes men's track and field athletes
Los Angeles Raiders players
Los Angeles Cobras players
Oakland Raiders players
American Conference Pro Bowl players
Pro Football Hall of Fame inductees
Track and field athletes from Houston
Players of American football from Houston
African-American players of American football